Mehdi Hassan Khan  18 July 1927 – 13 June 2012) was a Pakistani ghazal singer and playback singer for Lollywood. Widely considered one of the greatest and most influential figures in the history of ghazal singing, Hassan is referred to as the "Shahenshah-e-Ghazal" (Emperor of Ghazal). Known for his "haunting" baritone voice, Hassan is credited with bringing ghazal singing to a worldwide audience. He is unique for his melodic patterns and maintaining integrity of the ragas in an innovative way.

Born into a family of Kalawant musicians, Hassan was naturally inclined towards music from a young age. He influenced generations of singers from diverse genres, from Jagjit Singh to Parvez Mehdi. He earned numerous awards and accolades during his lifetime and remained a leading singer of Pakistani film industry along with another contemporary playback singer Ahmed Rushdi, and it is estimated that Hassan sang for over 300 films during his career. For his contributions to the arts, Hassan was awarded with the Nishan-e-Imtiaz, Tamgha-e-Imtiaz, Pride of Performance, and Hilal-e-Imtiaz by the Government of Pakistan.

Early life 
Hassan was born on 18 July 1927 in a village called Luna (Shekhawati) (Near Mandawa) in Jhunjhunu district in British India into a family of traditional musicians. He claims to be the 16th generation of hereditary musicians hailing from the Kalawant clan of musicians. Hassan started training in classical music at the age of eight and completed his musical training with his father Ustad Azeem Khan and uncle Ustad Ismail Khan who were both traditional Dhrupad singers. Hassan started performing at a young age and by the time he was 18 years old, Hassan is said to have mastered the classical singing forms of dhrupad, dadra, thumri, and khayal, and started performing at royal courts with his brother Ghulam Qadir. Hassan started his career primarily as a thumri exponent. His first concert of dhrupad and khayal with his elder brother is reported to have been held in Fazilka Bungla, near present DC House (1935) of Undivided Punjab. His elder brother Ustad Ghulam Qadir also was instrumental in sharpening his skills. 

After the partition of India in 1947, the 20-year-old Hassan and his family migrated to Pakistan, carrying little with them by way of material belongings. The family proceeded to his paternal aunt's house who lived in a village, Chak No 111/7R, near Chichawatni.  They suffered severe financial hardships in their new country. Hassan initially started working in nearby Chichawatni, in a bicycle shop Mughal Cycle House and later became a car and diesel tractor mechanic. Despite the financial hardships, he kept up his singing practice on a daily basis.

Singing career 
In 1957, Hassan was again given the opportunity to sing on Radio Pakistan, primarily as a thumri singer and later as a ghazal performer, which earned him recognition within the musical fraternity. He had a passion for Urdu poetry, and therefore, he began to experiment by singing ghazals on a part-time basis. He cites radio officers Z.A. Bukhari and Rafiq Anwar as additional influences in his progression as a ghazal singer. He first sang on Radio Pakistan in 1952. His first film song was "Nazar Milte Hi Dil Ki Bat Ka Charcha Na Ho Jaye" film Shikhar in 1956. This song was written by poet Yazdani Jalandhari and its music was composed by Asghar Ali M. Husain. In 1964, his ghazal for a film Farangi, "Gulon mein rang bharay, baad-e-naubahar chale" written by renowned Pakistani poet Faiz Ahmed Faiz and composed by Rasheed Attre, gave him a major breakthrough into the Pakistani film industry and he never looked back after that. Even the original ghazal poet Faiz Ahmed Faiz stopped reciting it in his 'mushairas' (poetry reciting events) and, instead, recommended that the audience ask Hassan to sing it for them because the poet jokingly used to say that the ghazal belonged to Hassan after its popularity.

In October 2010, HMV Label released "Sarhadein" in which his first and last duet song Tera Milna featuring Hassan and Lata Mangeshkar was released. This song was composed by Hassan and written by Farhat Shahzad. Hassan recorded it in Pakistan in 2009, and Mangeshkar later heard the track and recorded her part in India in 2010, and the song was later mixed for a duet. The same duet was also sung by Hassan and Noor Jehan.

Following a severe illness in the late 1980s, Hassan cut back on his singing, eventually stepping down from playback singing altogether. Later, due to the severity of his illness, he completely departed from music.

Tributes
Hassan is widely regarded as one of the greatest singers in the sub-continent and is said to have revolutionized the way ghazals were sung. In 1977, Indian playback singer Lata Mangeshkar was so moved by his dulcet vocals during a New Delhi concert that she reportedly said, "Aisa lagta hai ke unke gale mein bhagwan boltein hain" (it seems as though like God is singing through his voice). On 18 July 2018, the day of his 91st birthday, Google featured Hassan on its homepage doodle. Pakistani Prime Minister Yousuf Raza Gilani paid tribute to Hassan, calling him "an icon who mesmerized music lovers" for decades. Indian Prime Minister Manmohan Singh stated that Hassan "brought the sub-continental Sufi sensibilities to life through his songs," and that "the influence of his passion for Urdu poetry and initial grooming in Dhrupad tradition earned for him a special place in the world of music."

Death
Hassan suffered from a serious chronic lung condition for a few years before his death. He also received treatment for lung, urinary tract, and chest ailments at several hospitals in Pakistan for about 12 years prior to his death. Towards the end of 2000, he suffered his first stroke while in Kerala, India. In 2005, he was taken to India for ayurvedic treatment where he was welcomed by A.B. Vajpayee, Dilip Kumar, Lata Mangeshkar and many of his Indian fans. He suffered his second stroke soon after he returned from India which left him with speech impairments and limited his physical mobility. Hassan developed a severe chest infection and breathing difficulties in the days preceding his death. He died of multiple organ failure on 13 June 2012 at Aga Khan University Hospital in Karachi.

Musicians in his group and his students 

Some of the musicians who are associated with him :
Ustad Pir Bakhsh, Tabla player
Ustad Mohammed Hussain
Ustad Abdus Sattar Tari, Tabla player

Some of his students are:
Pervaiz Mehdi
Talat Aziz
Rajkumar Rizvi
Ghulam Abbas
Salamat Ali
Afzal, Munni Subhani
Rehan Ahmed Khan
Shamshad Husain Chanda
Shahnaz Begum (Bangladesh)
Yasmin Mushtari (Bangladesh)
Irshad Ali Mehdi
Hariharan

Family
Mehdi Hassan had 14 children. As many as six of his sons are active in the field of music. They are:
Tariq Mehdi Hassan (Versatile Playback Singer)
Arif Mehdi Hassan (Classical Tabla Player & Promoter)
Asif Mehdi Hassan (Playback & Ghazal Singer)
Kamran Mehdi Hassan (Playback & Ghazal Singer)
Imran Mehdi Hassan (Classical Tabla Player & Versatile Singer)
Faizan Mehdi Hassan (Versatile  Ghazal Singer).
Sajjad Mehdi Hassan (D.S.P Traffic police)
Shahzad Mehdi Hassan ( Ghazal Singer)
Waris Hassan Mehdi ( Pop Singer)

Awards

Civilian honours
The following civilian honours have been conferred on him, in chronological order.

The Government of India

1979 - K. L. Saigal Award in Jalandhar, India

The Government of Nepal
1983–Gorkha Dakshina Bahu

The Government of Pakistan
1985–Pride of Performance
Tamgha-e-Imtiaz
2010–Hilal-e-Imtiaz
2012–Nishan-e-Imtiaz

Nigar Awards
1964–Nigar Award for Best Male Playback Singer for Farangi
1968–Nigar Award for Best Male Playback Singer for Saiqa
1969–Nigar Award for Best Male Playback Singer for Zarqa
1972–Nigar Award for Best Male Playback Singer for Meri Zindagi Hai Naghma
1973–Nigar Award for Best Male Playback Singer for Naya Rasta
1974–Nigar Award for Best Male Playback Singer for Sharafat
1975–Nigar Award for Best Male Playback Singer for Zeenat
1976–Nigar Award for Best Male Playback Singer for Shabana
1977–Nigar Award for Best Male Playback Singer for Aaina
1999–Nigar Award Special Millennium Award

He had been the recipient of numerous awards and recognitions: the Tamgha-i-Imtiaz granted to him by Gen Ayub Khan; the Pride of Performance bestowed on him by Gen Ziaul Haq; and the Hilal-i-Imtiaz conferred by Gen Pervez Musharraf. Besides the Nigar Film and Graduate Awards from Pakistan, he was presented the Saigal Award in Jalandhar, India, in 1979, whereas the Gorkha Dakshina Bahu Award was given to him in Nepal in 1983. Recently, he travelled to Dubai to receive yet another award.

Albums
Some of his albums are:
 Kehna Usey
 Nazarana
 Live at Royal Albert Hall
 Andaz-e-Mastana
 Classical Ghazals vol. 1, 2, 3
 Dil Jo Rota Hai
 Ghalib Ghazals
 Ghazals For Ever Vol 1
 Golden Collection Of Mehdi Hassan Vol 1, 2
 Golden Greats
 In Concert
 Khuli Jo Aankh
 Life Story
 Live at Khambays
 Live Concert in India
 Mehdi Hassan
 Mehdi Hassan Ghazals Vol. 1
 Sada E Ishq
 Sarhadein
 Sur Ki Koi Seema Nahin
 The Finest Ghazals
 The Legend
 Yaadgar Ghazalen Vol. 1
 Tarz (with Shobha Gurtu)
 Naqsh-e-Faryadi
 Mehdi Hassan (EMI-Pakistan Released) VOLUME 1
 Mehdi Hassan Sings Punjabi Film Hits (EMI-Pakistan Released)
 Mehdi Hassan (EMI-Pakistan Released) VOLUME 2

Ghazals
 Alam-e-Khwaab ho ya 
 Aagay Barhe Na Qissa -E -Ishq -E- Butaan Se Hum
 Aaj tak yaad hai woh Pyaar ka Manzar
 Aaj Tu Ghair Sahi (Poet: Kemal Ahmad)
 Aa Ke Sajda Nashin Kais Hua (Poet: Mir Taqi Mir)
 Aankhon Se Mili Aankhen
 Aap Ki Aankhon Ne
 Aap ko bhul jayen ham
Aaye Kuch Abr (Poet: Faiz Ahmed Faiz)
 Ab Ke Hum Bichde To Shaayad Kabhi Khwaabon Mein Milein (Poet: Ahmed Faraz)
 Ae Raushnion Ke Shahr Bata
 Anjuman Anjuman Shanaasaayi
 Apno Ne Gham Diye To Yaad Aa Gaya
 Arze Niyaze Ishq Ke
 Baat karni mujhe mushkil kabhi aisi tau na thii (poet: Bahadur Shah Zafar)
 Beqarari si Beqarari hai 
 Bheegi Hui Aankhon Ka
 Bhuuli bisri chand umeedein
  (Poet: Mir Taqi Mir)
 Chirag-e-toor Jalao bada Andhera hai (Poet: Saghar Siddiqui)
 Dekh to dil keh jaan se uthta hai (Poet: Mir Taqi Mir)
 Dekhna Unka Kankhiyo Sey
 Dil-E-Nadan Tujhe Hua Kya Hai (Poet: Mirza Ghalib)
 Dil-E-Veeran Hai Teri Yaad Hai Tanhai Hai
 Dil Ki Baat Labon Par Laakar.
 Dil mein ab yu tere Bhule huye ghum aate hai 
 Deewar Dar Pe
 Dil Men Toofan Chupae Betha Hoon
 Duniya Kisi Ke Pyaar Mein Jaanat Se Kam Nahin
 Duniya Se Tujhko
 Dayam Pada Hua Tere Dar Pe Nahi Hoon Main (Poet: Mirza Ghalib)
 Ek Bar Chale Aao
 Ek Bus Tu Hi Nahin Mujhse Khafa Ho Baitha (Poet: Farhat Shezhad)
 Ek Jhalak Dikhla De
 Ek Khilta Hua Gulab
 Ek Sitam Aur Meri Jaan, Abhi Jaan Baqi Hai (Poet: Masroor Anwar)
 Fikr hii thaharii to dil ko fikr-e-Khubaan kyon Na Ho (Poet: Josh Malihabadi)
 faisla tumko bhool jane ka 
 Ga mere Deewaane Dil (Musician: Kamal Ahmed)
 Garmi-e-Hasrat-e-Naakaam se jal Jaate Hain
 Garche Sau Bar ghum-e-hijr se jaan
 Gham ki Aandhi Chali (Raag: Lalit)
 Ghazab Kiya Tere Waade Pe Aitbaar Kiya (Poet: Daagh Dehalvi)
 Gair Banke na mile hum
 Go zara si baat par Barso ke Yaaraane gaye
 Gulon mein Rang Bhare Baad-e-Naubahar Chale (Lyrics: Faiz Ahmed Faiz)
 Gulshan gulshan shola e gul ki
 Guncha-e-Shauq Laga hei Khilne
 Hamari Sanson Men Aaj Tak
 Har Dard Ko
 Humein koi ghum nahi tha ghum-e-Aashiqi se Pehle
 Hum hi mein thi na koi baat
 Ik husn ki devi se Mujhe Pyaar hua tha
 Ik khalish ko haasil-e-umr-e-ravaan rehne diya (Poet: Adeeb Saharanpuri)
 Jab bhi aati hai teri yaad Kabhi Shaam ke baad
 Jab Bhi Chahen Ek Nai Soorat
 Jab Bhi Pee Kar
 Jab Koi Piar Se Bulaae Ga, Tujh Ko Ik Shakhsh Yaad Aaey Ga (Poet: Khawaja Pervez)
 Jab Tere Nain Muskurate Hain (Raag Sahara)
 Jab Us Zulf Ki Baat Chali
 Jahan Jake Chain
 Jo Chahte ho woh Kehte ho (Raag Nat Bhairav)
 Jo thakey thakey se they hausley
 Kahan Gai Woh Wafa
 Khuli Jo Aankh Woh Tha (Poet: Farhat Shezhad)
 Kiya Hei Pyaar Jisse Humne Zindagi ki Tarah
 Kya Bhala Mujhko Parakhne Ka Nateeja Nikla
 Ku ba ku phail gai 
 Kyoon Humse Khafa Ho Gaye Ae Jaan-E-Tamanna
 Main Hosh Mein Tha
 Main Khayal hoon kisi aur ka (Poet: Saleem Kausar)
 Main Nazar se pee raha hoon
 Mohabat Karne Waale (Raag Khamaj)
 Mohabat Zindagi Hai Aur Tum Meri Mohabat Ho
 Mujhe Tum Nazar Se Gira To Rahe Ho
 Naavak andaz jidhar diida-e-jaana honge (Poet: Momin Khan Momin)
 Nishan Bhi Koi Na Chhora keh
 Patta Patta Boota Boota haal Hamaara Jaane hai (Poet: Mir Taqi Mir)
 
 Pyaar Bhare Do Sharmile Nain (Music: Robin Ghosh)
 Qissa-E-Gham Mein Tera Naam
 Rafta Rafta woh meri Hasti ka Saamaan ho gaye
 Ranjish Hi Sahi Dil Hi Dukhaane Ke Liye Aa (Poet: Ahmed Faraz) (Raag Yaman)
 Rim Jhim Ki Barsaat Hai Aur Jaage Huye Jazbaat Hain
 Roshan Jamal-e-yaar se hai    
 Shaheron Mulkon Main jo Ye Mir (Poet: Mir Taqi Mir)
 Saamne Aa Ke Tujhko Pukara Nahin (poet: Khawaja Pervez)
 Sahar Ho Rahi Hai
 Shikwa Na Kar Gila Na Kar Ye Duniya Hai Pyaare
 Shola tha jal Bujha hoo (Poet: Ahmed Faraz) (Raag Kirwani)
 Tanha thi aur Hamesha se Tanha hai Zindagi
 Tark-e-Ulfat ka sila
 Tere Bheege Badan ki Khushboo se
 Tere mere Pyaar ka aisa Naata hai
 Teri Khushi mein agar gham mein bhi Khushi na huyi (Raag Madhuwanti)
 Toote huye Khwaabo ke liye
 Thahar Thori der to
 Tune Yeh Phuul Jo Zulfon Me Saja Rakha Hai (Poet: Qateel Shifai) 
 Tu meri Zindagi hai
 Usne jab meri Taraf
 Uzr aane mein bhi hai aur Bulaate bhi nahi (Poet: Daagh Dehalvi)
 Woh Dilnawaz hai Lekin Nazar Shanaas nahi
 Woh Zara si Baar par
 Yaad Teri ny Zamane ko Bhulla Rakha Hy
 Yaaro kisi Qaatil se Kabhi Pyaar na Maango
 Yun na mil mujhse khafa ho jaise (Raags Bilawal and Bhairavi)
 Ye Dhuaan kaha se Uthta hai
 Ye Kaghzi Phool Jaise Chahre
 Ye Mojeza bhi Mohabbat Kabhi Dikhaaye Mujhe (Raag MadhuKauns)
 Ye Tera Naazuk Badan Hai Ya Koi Mehka Gulaab
 Yoon Zindagi Ki Raah Mein Takra Gaya Koi
 Zindagi Mein To Sabhi Pyaar Kiya Karte Hain
 Zulf Ko Teri Ghataon Ka Payam Aaya Hai
 Mehadi Hassan also sang Persian/dari ghazals in Kabul Afghanistan in 1970s.
Ulti ho gyi sab tadbeereN kuchh na dawa ne kaam kia (Poet: Mir)

See also
Begum Akhtar
Talat Mahmood
Ghulam Ali
Jagjit Singh
Pankaj Udhas

References

External links
 
 
 India-born Ghazal legend Mehdi Hassan Died

1927 births
2012 deaths
Recipients of Hilal-i-Imtiaz
Recipients of Nishan-e-Imtiaz
Nigar Award winners
Pakistani ghazal singers
Pakistani Muslims
20th-century Pakistani male singers
Recipients of the Pride of Performance
Order of Gorkha Dakshina Bahu
People from Jhunjhunu district
People from Chichawatni
Infectious disease deaths in Sindh
Pakistani performers of Islamic music
Pakistani playback singers
Pakistani people of Rajasthani descent
Pakistani classical singers
Recipients of Sitara-i-Imtiaz
Disease-related deaths in Sindh